Giants of the Organ Come Together is an album by American jazz organists Jimmy McGriff and Groove Holmes recorded in 1973 and released on the Groove Merchant label.

Track listing
All compositions by Jimmy McGriff and Groove Holmes except where noted
 "Licks A'Plenty" (Eddie Davis) – 6:59
 "Out of Nowhere" (Howard Scott, Morris Dickerson, Harold Brown, Charles Miller, Lonnie Jordan, Thomas Allen) – 8:33
 "The Squirrel" – 5:24
 "Finger Lickin' Good" – 6:18
 "How High the Moon" (Morgan Lewis, Nancy Hamilton) – 7:03
 "Things Ain't What They Used to Be" (Mercer Ellington, Ted Persons) – 6:48

Personnel
Groove Holmes, Jimmy McGriff – organ
George Freeman, O'Donel Levy – guitar
Bernard Purdie – drums
Kwasi Jayourba – congas

References

Groove Merchant albums
Jimmy McGriff albums
Richard Holmes (organist) albums
1973 albums
Albums produced by Sonny Lester